The men's 100 metre freestyle event at the 1968 Olympic Games took place between 18 and 19 October. There were 64 competitors from 34 nations. Nations had been limited to three swimmers each since the 1924 Games (except in 1960, when the limit was two). The event was won by Michael Wenden of Australia, the nation's third victory in four Games (tied for second-most all-time with Hungary behind the United States' eight). Americans Ken Walsh and Mark Spitz took silver and bronze, respectively.

Background

This was the 15th appearance of the men's 100 metre freestyle. The event has been held at every Summer Olympics except 1900 (when the shortest freestyle was the 200 metres), though the 1904 version was measured in yards rather than metres.

One of the eight finalists from the 1964 Games returned: silver medalist Bobby McGregor of Great Britain. The favorite coming into the Games was Zac Zorn, who had matched the world record at the U.S. trials. However, Zorn had struggled the week before the competition with illness. His teammates, Ken Walsh (whose record it was that Zorn had tied) and young butterfly specialist Mark Spitz, were strong contenders, as was McGregor (who had won the European championship).

Barbados, Costa Rica, El Salvador, Ireland, Jamaica, Lebanon, and Trinidad and Tobago each made their debut in the event; West Germany competed separately for the first time. The United States made its 15th appearance, having competed at each edition of the event to date.

Competition format

The competition used a three-round (heats, semifinals, final) format. The advancement rule followed the format introduced in 1952. A swimmer's place in the heat was not used to determine advancement; instead, the fastest times from across all heats in a round were used. There were 9 heats of between 6 and 8 swimmers each. The top 24 swimmers advanced to the semifinals. There were 3 semifinals of 8 swimmers each. The top 8 swimmers advanced to the final. Swim-offs were used as necessary to break ties.

This swimming event used freestyle swimming, which means that the method of the stroke is not regulated (unlike backstroke, breaststroke, and butterfly events). Nearly all swimmers use the front crawl or a variant of that stroke. Because an Olympic size swimming pool is 50 metres long, this race consisted of two lengths of the pool.

Records

These were the standing world and Olympic records (in seconds) prior to the 1968 Summer Olympics.

Zac Zorn matched the Olympic record in the second semifinal; Michael Wenden beat it in the third with 52.9 seconds. Wenden dropped the record again, to 52.2 seconds, in the final; all three medalists beat the old record time.

Schedule

All times are Central Standard Time (UTC-6)

Results

Heats

There were 9 heats in this category. The 24 fastest swimmers from the heats advanced to the semifinals.

Semifinals

The 8 fastest swimmers advanced to the final. Zorn matched the previous Olympic record of 53.4 seconds in semifinal 2 before Wenden broke that record with a 52.9 second time in semifinal 3.

Final

Zorn lead the field at the 50 metre turn, but weakened by a week long illness, faded and finished last.

References

External links
Men 100m Freestyle Swimming Olympic Games 1968 Mexico City (MEX)

Men's freestyle 100 metre
Men's events at the 1968 Summer Olympics